Dana Grey Kirk (July 23, 1935 – February 15, 2010) was an American college basketball coach. He was the head coach for the Memphis State University (now the University of Memphis) men's team from 1979 to 1986.  His coaching record was 158–58, including a Final Four appearance in 1985.  He had previously been the head coach at Virginia Commonwealth University from 1976 to 1979 with a record of 57–23 and the University of Tampa from 1966 to 1971, with a record of 68-59, (.535).  Following his stint at Tampa, he was an assistant coach for Denny Crum at the University of Louisville.

Memphis State
Kirk built the Tigers into a national powerhouse with teams consisting largely of Memphis-area players.  However, he only graduated six players in seven years, including only two on the celebrated 1985 team. Only a year after the Final Four appearance, it was revealed that Memphis State had committed many severe recruiting violations while Kirk was head coach. In addition, Kirk himself was arrested on felony charges following an investigation.

Indictment
In 1986, the NCAA forced Memphis State to vacate all of their NCAA tournament appearances from 1982 until 1985. Kirk was indicted by a federal Grand Jury on 11 counts of tax evasion, filing false income tax returns, mail fraud and obstruction of justice.  At his trial, witnesses testified that he scalped tickets for as much as five times face value, took money from boosters to give to players and actively solicited kickbacks from tournament promoters.  He served four months in a federal minimum-security prison in Montgomery, Alabama.  After serving out his sentence, he returned to Memphis where he hosted a sports talk show on WHBQ (AM). He has also published his autobiography Simply Amazing, The Dana Kirk Story, written with Dallas talk show host and columnist Mark Davis, who was at WHBQ at the time.

Retirement
He retired and lived in Memphis, Tennessee with his wife Denise McCrary, a successful attorney. If asked about any of the happenings surrounding his Memphis State years, he would only respond "I don't do negativity". Dana Kirk died of a heart attack at Methodist University Hospital in Memphis on February 15, 2010.

Head coaching record

See also
 List of NCAA Division I Men's Final Four appearances by coach

References

External links
 NY Times article describing criminal charges
 ESPN article about Dana Kirk radio show

1935 births
2010 deaths
American men's basketball coaches
American men's basketball players
Basketball coaches from Tennessee
Basketball players from Memphis, Tennessee
Charleston Golden Eagles men's basketball players
College men's basketball head coaches in the United States
Louisville Cardinals men's basketball coaches
Memphis Tigers men's basketball coaches
Sportspeople from Memphis, Tennessee
Tampa Spartans men's basketball coaches
VCU Rams men's basketball coaches